Ingrid Kristiansen (née Christensen on 21 March 1956) is a Norwegian former athlete. She was one of the best female long-distance runners during the 1980s. She is a former world record holder in the 5000 metres, 10,000 metres and the marathon (at one point in time she held those records simultaneously). Kristiansen was a World Champion on the track, roads and cross-country, becoming the first athlete to win World titles on all three surfaces. At the 1984 Los Angeles Olympics, she finished fourth in the first women's Olympic marathon. At the 1988 Seoul Olympics, she dropped out of the 10,000 metres final while leading. Early in her career, she was also an elite cross country skier, winning several Norwegian titles and a European junior championships.

Kristiansen's 1986 world record in the 10,000 m was not broken for 5 years. Her 1985 London Marathon 2:21:06 was the record marathon time for 13 years.

Career
Ingrid Kristiansen started her career quite unremarkably, running 2:30 to 2:40 for her first few marathons. She won the bronze medal in the 3000 metres at the 1980 World Championships in Athletics and won the 1983 Houston Marathon in 2:33:27 while two months pregnant—a fact she didn't know until two months later. It was not until she gave birth to her first son, Gaute, that her times began to improve. After winning the Houston Marathon again and the London Marathon in 1984, she placed fourth in the first Olympic women's marathon in Los Angeles. She also set two track world records in the 5,000 m (14:58.9) on 28 June 1984 and the 10,000 m (30:59.14) on 27 July 1985, at the Bislett Games in Oslo.

In 1985 she won the London Marathon again in a new world record of 2:21:06; the previous record was 2:22:43 set in the 1983 Boston Marathon by Joan Benoit. Later in 1985 she lost to Benoit in the Chicago Marathon, running 2:23:05 for second place.

1986 was Kristiansen's best year in track. After she won the Boston Marathon in hot conditions, she set a new world record in the 10,000 m (30:13.3), smashing her own world record from 1984 by 46 seconds. Then she broke the 5,000 m world record, running 14:37.89. On 5 April 1987, she won a half marathon in Sandnes, running 1:06:40, but the course was not measured properly and the world record still remained with Joan Benoit. She won the Chicago Marathon, once again in hot and humid conditions, running 2:27:08. She ended the year winning the 10,000 m event at European Championships, running the 2nd fastest time ever (30:23.3) and nearly 40 seconds ahead of the second-place finisher.

In 1987 Kristiansen attempted to break her marathon world record in London, but she slowed in the second half and won in 2:22:48. She won the first World Championships Women's 10,000 m in Rome, despite a leg injury.
In 1988 she won the London Marathon for the fourth time, finishing in a time of 2:25:41. Despite a 1:09 first half, she slowed dramatically in the second half, however she was still five minutes ahead of any other woman. At the Olympic Games in Seoul, she participated in the 10,000 m, and even though she was the heavy favourite, she dropped out after seven laps with a fractured bone in her foot.

She returned to racing in 1989, winning the Boston Marathon in 2:24:33 despite the heat in the latter stages. She decided not to run any track races that year, but she still won a few road races in Europe. Her final marathon was the 1989 New York City Marathon, which she won in a time of 2:25:30, running away with it from the start. Gradually she raced less and less, despite winning the 1990 City-Pier-City Loop in The Hague. She retired in 1993 and lives with her husband and two children in Oslo, Norway.

She won 14 out of 26 marathons entered.

Achievements

Note: The 1987 World Road Race Championship was held in November while the 1988 edition was held in March.

World Records
5000 m world record with 14:58.89 in Oslo, 28 June 1984  –  first woman to run under 15 minutes
5000 m world record with 14:37.33 in Stockholm, 5 August 1986
10,000 m world record with 30:59.42 in Oslo, 27 July 1985  –  first woman to run under 31 minutes
10,000 m world record with 30:13.74 in Oslo, 5 July 1986
Marathon world record with 2:21:06 in London, 21 April 1985  – record stood for 13 years.

Other
24 individual Norwegian championships
1992 Egebergs Ærespris

Personal bests

* Because of a measurement error this run doesn't qualify for record purposes.

Cross-country skiing results

World Championships

References

External links

 
 

1956 births
Living people
Sportspeople from Trondheim
Norwegian female long-distance runners
Norwegian female marathon runners
Norwegian female cross-country skiers
Olympic athletes of Norway
Athletes (track and field) at the 1984 Summer Olympics
Athletes (track and field) at the 1988 Summer Olympics
World Athletics Championships athletes for Norway
World Athletics Championships medalists
European Athletics Championships medalists
World Athletics Cross Country Championships winners
London Marathon female winners
Boston Marathon female winners
Chicago Marathon female winners
New York City Marathon female winners
World record setters in athletics (track and field)
IAAF World Women's Road Race Championships winners
World Athletics Championships winners